Nelson Isurina Mariano II (born June 28, 1974) is a Filipino chess player. He was awarded the title of Grandmaster by FIDE in 2004, the fifth from the Philippines. Mariano won the Asian Junior Chess Championship in 1994.

Life and career
Mariano is currently the chief coach of ASEAN Chess Academy, a grandmaster school based in Singapore. Nelson grew up in the Philippines, where he began to learn chess at the age of 3 under the tutelage of his father, Nelson I, his first chess coach. He was educated at the University of the East.

The prodigy was soon defeating opponents older and more experienced than himself. Nelson, his sister Cristine Rose Mariano, a Woman International Master and FIDE-Instructor, Carmina Joy Mariano and his brother Nelson Mariano III FIDE Master are all Filipino chess players. At the age of 7, he played his first serious game against a carpenter beside their house in Cebu City. 

When the Mariano family moved to Manila from Cebu, Jet started playing in serious competitions, mostly in men's division and under-20 category. He achieved the International Master (IM) title when he became the 1994 Champion at the Asian Junior Chess Championship held in Shah Alam, Malaysia at the age of 19.

The President of the Philippines, Honorable Fidel V. Ramos honored Nelson for his outstanding performances in the Asian Junior and World Juniors Chess Championship in August 1994 placing equal 3rd, held in Matinhos, Brazil, the highest place attained ever by a Filipino chess players until today.

In April 2004, "GM Jet" earned his second GM norm at the 6th Dubai Open Championships and went on to earn his final GM norm at the Bangkok GM Circuit event in Thailand. In 2007, International Grandmaster Nelson "Jet" Mariano II decided to retire and teach chess in Singapore. 
 
In 2006, Mariano was given the Distinguished Achievement Award by the University of the East for his achievements in the field of chess. This award has been given to nine outstanding sportspersons in the 60 years of the University's history. That includes James Yap, Robert Jaworski, The Vice President of the Philippines Honorable Noli de Castro, and five others. GM Jet as his students call him was also the coach/trainer/and sparring partner of GM Rogelio Antonio Jr. in his match against GM Eugenio Torre, Manila 1998.

In 2008, he started his own chess school, Chesskidz LLP and has since been imparting his knowledge in chess to children, youth and adults around the region.

Retirement from chess

After a strong runner-up finish in the prestigious Asian Zonal 3.3 World Cup qualifier held in Phu Quoc, Vietnam in 2007. Nelson announced his retirement in February 2007 from competitive chess. He cited the reason to pursue his dream of imparting his knowledge to the younger generation of chess players.

(He conveyed it to National Chess Federation of the Philippines President Prospero Pichay Jr. and the late Executive Director Wilfredo Abalos ) and expressed fulfillment of what he had achieved throughout his chess career.

Being a good standing member of the National Chess Federation of the Philippines, Nelson was offered to lead the Philippine Team to the 2007 Asian Cities Chess Championship because of his good performance at the Asian Zonal 3.3 Championship. Nelson respectfully declined and gave up his slot to the younger Filipino chess players to play in Asian Cities Chess Championship in Iran that was held March 1–9, 2007 in Tehran.

Post-retirement chess 

On 29 August 2010 in his first public chess event since his retirement, Nelson played in the 2010 Merdeka Chess Team Championships held in Kuala Lumpur, Malaysia. An event played with the time control of 25 minutes per player, Nelson scored 6.5/9 on Board 1 (4 wins and 5 draws) leading his team Chesskidz LLP-Men's Team to its first ever Merdeka Championship Crown.

Nelson has been coaching Chesskidz LLP students - a grandmaster chess school in Singapore since July 2008. The 2010 Merdeka Chess Team Championship in Malaysia was one of the chess programs of Chesskidz LLP organized as the first field trip exposure for its students.

Prior to his transfer to Chesskidz LLP, he resigned from Power Chess Asia, where he was asked to sign an addendum, stating that if he quits from the company, he cannot work in Singapore in anything related to chess for 36 months, failure of which will have him pay PCA S$50,000 (roughly P1.5 million). He won a defamation case against this said former employer.

Notable games

Achievements (1987–2010)

References

External links
 
 
 
 
 

1974 births
Living people
Filipino chess players
Chess grandmasters
Chess Olympiad competitors
Chess coaches
Filipino expatriate sportspeople in Singapore
Southeast Asian Games silver medalists for the Philippines
Southeast Asian Games medalists in chess
Competitors at the 2005 Southeast Asian Games
University of the East alumni
Sportspeople from Manila